The black-marked inga moth (Inga sparsiciliella) is a species of moth of the family Oecophoridae. It has been recorded from Costa Rica, Mexico, Arkansas, Oklahoma, Missouri, Texas, South Carolina, Alabama, Florida, Georgia, North Carolina and Virginia.

The wingspan is about 16 mm.

External links
Bug Guide
Images

Moths described in 1864
Inga (moth)